Rebricea is a commune in Vaslui County, Western Moldavia, Romania. It is composed of nine villages: Bolați, Crăciunești, Draxeni, Măcrești, Rateșu Cuzei, Rebricea, Sasova, Tatomirești and Tufeștii de Jos.

References

Communes in Vaslui County
Localities in Western Moldavia